The following is a list of Malayalam films released in the year 1996.

Dubbed films
The following is a list of Malayalam films (dubbed from other languages) released in the year 1996.

References

 1996
1996
Malayalam
 Mal
1996 in Indian cinema